LaMotta may refer to:

 Jake LaMotta (1921–2017), American boxer
 Joey LaMotta (1925–2020), American boxer and manager
 Joseph LaMotta (1948–1998), the son of boxer Jake LaMotta
 Richard LaMotta (1942–2010), the inventor of the Chipwich ice cream sandwich
 Vikki LaMotta (1930–2005), the wife of boxer Jake LaMotta